Clarice is a 2021 American crime drama television series created by Alex Kurtzman and Jenny Lumet and produced by CBS Studios, MGM Television, and Secret Hideout. It is based on the best-selling 1988 novel The Silence of the Lambs by Thomas Harris and set between the events of the 1991 film and Hannibal (2001). The series stars Rebecca Breeds as the titular character, along with Lucca De Oliveira, Devyn A. Tyler, Kal Penn, Nick Sandow, Michael Cudlitz, and Marnee Carpenter. The series premiered on February 11, 2021, on CBS.

In May 2021, CBS entered negotiations to relocate the series to Paramount+ for its second season. By June, the relocation became "unlikely" to happen.

Cast

Main

 Rebecca Breeds as Clarice Starling
 Michael Cudlitz as Paul Krendler
 Lucca De Oliveira as Tomas Esquivel
 Kal Penn as Shaan Tripathi
 Nick Sandow as Murray Clarke
 Devyn A. Tyler as Ardelia Mapp
 Marnee Carpenter as Catherine Martin

Recurring
 Shawn Doyle as Clarice's original therapist
 Jayne Atkinson as United States Attorney General Ruth Martin
 K. C. Collins as Agent Garrett
 Tim Guinee as Novak
 Peter McRobbie as Nils Hagen
 Douglas Smith as Tyson Conway
 Simon Northwood as Jame "Buffalo Bill" Gumb
 Elizabeth Saunders as Bea Love

Episodes

Production

Development 
In January 2020, CBS Studios hired Alex Kurtzman and Jenny Lumet to create a sequel series to the 1991 film The Silence of the Lambs. 
 Elizabeth Saunders as Bea Love 
 The series was among the 14 pilot episodes ordered by CBS in February and was fast-tracked to series the following March, as CBS was shut down and unable to film pilot episodes because of the COVID-19 pandemic. CBS picked up the series on May 8 and announced in December a premiere of February 11, 2021, alongside a trailer release. Due to complicated rights issues of franchise characters between Metro-Goldwyn-Mayer and the Dino de Laurentiis Company, the series cannot feature or make reference to Hannibal Lecter. Kurtzman explained, "I'm still trying to understand how the rights are divided. But it's been quite liberating because we have no interest in writing about Hannibal—not because we didn't love the films and the show, but because it was done so well by so many people that it didn't feel fresh for us."

In May 2021, CBS entered negotiations to relocate the series to Paramount+ for its second season. By June, the relocation became "unlikely" to happen, despite it never being officially cancelled.

Casting
Rebecca Breeds was cast as Clarice Starling in February 2020. Lucca De Oliveira and Devyn A. Tyler were cast in starring roles. Kal Penn, Nick Sandow, and Michael Cudlitz joined the main cast. Marnee Carpenter was cast as a series regular while Jayne Atkinson, Shawn Doyle, and Tim Guinee were cast in recurring roles. Douglas Smith joined the cast in a recurring capacity.

Filming
Principal photography for the series began on September 21, 2020, in Toronto, Ontario, Canada. Filming of the first season concluded on March 23, 2021.

Reception

Critical response
On Rotten Tomatoes, the series has an approval rating of 37% based on reviews from 43 critics, with an average rating of 6.11/10. The website's critics consensus reads, "Effectively grim, but narratively bland, Clarice is a disturbingly safe procedural that lets down both its talented cast and source material." Metacritic gave the series a weighted average score of 55 out of 100 based on 32 critic reviews, indicating "mixed or average reviews".

Ratings

References

External links 
 
 

2020s American crime drama television series
2020s American horror television series
2020s American mystery television series
2020s American police procedural television series
2021 American television series debuts
2021 American television series endings
American sequel television series
American prequel television series
American television spin-offs
Cannibalism in fiction
CBS original programming
English-language television shows
Fiction about familicide
Hannibal Lecter mass media
Psychological horror
Serial drama television series
Interquel television series
Television productions suspended due to the COVID-19 pandemic
Television series about fictional serial killers
Television series about the Federal Bureau of Investigation
Television series by CBS Studios
Television series by MGM Television
Television series created by Alex Kurtzman
Television shows filmed in Toronto
Television series set in 1993
Television shows about diseases and disorders
Television shows based on American novels
Television shows set in Washington, D.C.
Works about psychoanalysis